The Obernkirchen Sandstein or Obernkirchen Sandstone is a geological unit in Lower Saxony, Germany whose strata date back to the Early Cretaceous. The remains of the dinosaur Stenopelix and numerous dinosaur tracks are known from the unit. The unit is a thin interval within the Bückeberg Formation As its name would suggest the lithology primarily consists of sandstone with thin intercalations of coal. This was deposited in a sandy barrier to lagoonal complex setting. The unit has historically been extensively quarried for its high quality building stone, which has been used as far away as Jakarta.

Vertebrate paleofauna

See also 
 List of dinosaur-bearing rock formations

References 

Geologic formations of Germany
Lower Cretaceous Series of Europe
Berriasian Stage
Sandstone formations
Coal formations
Deltaic deposits
Ichnofossiliferous formations
Coal in Germany
Paleontology in Germany